Steffon Bradford (born December 7, 1977) is an American professional basketball player, from Clewiston, Florida. Steffon Bradford currently coaches 12 AAU teams LES Bulldogs through his company Lifeline Elite Sports.

References

External links
 Profil zawodnika na stronie AZS Koszalin (Polish)
 Profil zawodnika na stronie Israeli Basketball Super League

1977 births
Living people
American expatriate basketball people in France
American expatriate basketball people in Israel
American expatriate basketball people in Poland
American expatriate basketball people in Portugal
American expatriate basketball people in South Korea
American men's basketball players
AZS Koszalin players
Barreirense Basket players
Basketball players from Florida
Hapoel Afula players
Junior college men's basketball players in the United States
JDA Dijon Basket players
Lille Métropole BC players
Limoges CSP players
Nanterre 92 players
Nebraska Cornhuskers men's basketball players
People from Clewiston, Florida
Seoul Samsung Thunders players
Seoul SK Knights players
Centers (basketball)
Power forwards (basketball)